Stephen Beckett (born 24 May 1967) is an English actor, known for portraying Dr Matt Ramsden in Coronation Street and Mike Jarvis in The Bill.

Background
Born in London, Beckett was brought up in Brixton and Croydon, and attended Wilson's School in Wallington. He has three sisters. Beckett left school at the age of sixteen to become an actor, and began his career in street theatre in Covent Garden. He later trained at RADA, graduating at the age of twenty three.

Career
Beckett won his first professional roles a week after graduating from drama school, appearing in Richard II and Callas at the Oldham Coliseum. He went on to work in regional theatre throughout the UK, and with the National Theatre.

Beckett played the role of PC Mike Jarvis in The Bill for five years. He later played Dr Matt Ramsden in Coronation Street from 2000 to 2002, reprising the role in 2006. Discussing the character and the possibility of a return, Beckett said: "People were really protective of Ashley, and very anti the child-stealing doctor. I don't know about returning to Corrie again, but as long as Ashley is in the show there is a potential kidnap plot." But as the character of Ashley has now been written out with the rest of his on-screen family to follow shortly the return of Dr. Ramsden seems unlikely.

His other television credits include Robin Hood, Doctors and Casualty. In 2006, he guest starred as Richard III in the Doctor Who audio drama The Kingmaker.

Beckett's theatre work includes the original productions of the Alan Ayckbourn plays Drowning on Dry Land and Private Fears in Public Places, Around the World in Eighty Days, The Ghost Train, Murder with Love, Walk Hard, The Business of Murder, The Late Edwina Black and Absurd Person Singular. He has also appeared in pantomime.

Beckett played Prospero in The Tempest for the 2017 open air Stafford Festival Shakespeare 22 June – 8 July 2017.

Television

Film

Video Games

References

External links

People from Herne Hill
Alumni of RADA
English male stage actors
English male soap opera actors
English male film actors
1967 births
Living people
20th-century English male actors
21st-century English male actors
People educated at Wilson's School, Wallington
Male actors from London